In enzymology, a (S)-coclaurine-N-methyltransferase is an enzyme that catalyzes the chemical reaction

S-adenosyl-L-methionine + (S)-coclaurine  S-adenosyl-L-homocysteine + (S)-N-methylcoclaurine

Thus, the two substrates of this enzyme are S-adenosyl methionine and (S)-coclaurine, whereas its two products are S-adenosylhomocysteine and (S)-N-methylcoclaurine.

This enzyme belongs to the family of transferases, specifically those transferring one-carbon group methyltransferases.  The systematic name of this enzyme class is S-adenosyl-L-methionine:(S)-coclaurine-N-methyltransferase. This enzyme participates in alkaloid biosynthesis i.

References

 

EC 2.1.1
Enzymes of unknown structure